Kumi Town, commonly called Kumi, is a town in the Eastern Region of Uganda. It is the main municipal, administrative, and commercial center in Kumi District and is the site of the district headquarters.

Location
The coordinates of the town are 1°29'36.0"N, 33°56'15.0"E (Latitude:1.493334; Longitude:33.937500).

Population
The national census in 2002 estimated the population of the town of Kumi at 8,800. In 2010, the Uganda Bureau of Statistics (UBOS) estimated the population at 12,500. In 2011, UBOS estimated the mid-year population at 13,000. In 2014, the national population census and household survey enumerated the population of Kumi Town at 36,493 people, of whom 18,690 (51.2 percent) were female and 17,803 (48.8 percent) were male.

Points of interest

Notable people
 Thomas Aisu (1954–2018), physician, microbiologist, academic and academic administrator, who at the time of his death was an associate professor at Soroti University.

 Anne Atai Omoruto (1956-2016), was a Ugandan family physician, public health specialist, and academic. In 2014, she led a team of 12 Ugandan physicians as part of the World Health Organization's response to the Ebola outbreak in Liberia.[1]

See also
List of cities and towns in Uganda

References

External links
Kumi University Planning A Medical School

Populated places in Eastern Region, Uganda
Cities in the Great Rift Valley
Kumi District
Teso sub-region